Larry "Link" Linkogle (born February 12, 1977 in Orange, California) is a professional freestyle motocross rider and the co-founder and owner of Metal Mulisha, LLC.  Linkogle holds the world record for long-distance motorcycle jumps and has appeared in feature films as a stuntman. He is regarded as a founder of freestyle motocross.

Metal Mulisha is one of the most-recognized freestyle motocross teams in the world and is an internationally known lifestyle apparel line. What started off as Linkogle and friends wearing Metal Mulisha gear while performing tricks and jumps at the first-ever FMX course—the Metal Mulisha Compound built at Linkogle’s childhood home—has grown into one of the most recognized and respected brands in action sports.

On December 6, 2001, while serving as the stunt double for Vin Diesel in the movie XXX, Linkogle was accidentally struck by a helicopter blade during a stunt for the movie.  At the time of the accident, the injuries suffered were believed to have been minor and Linkogle walked away from the accident.  Shortly after the accident, it was discovered that his frontal lobe was torn away from his skull from the impact with the Huey helicopter's blade and his ACL snapped and shoulder separated from the resulting fall.

Early life
Linkogle was age 11 when he first started to ride motorcycles in the desert and within months began competing in amateur contests. By 16, Linkogle was the youngest professional rider in the circuit. After a successful career in motocross, Linkogle envisioned an elevated form of motocross with the addition of awe-inspiring jumps and tricks. It was no easy feat to switch from  circuit racing to a purely freestyle riding but he was determined to not let corporate influence dictate the evolution of a new, exciting sport.
His vision set the foundation for freestyle motocross which involved daredevil skills to perform airborne tricks on a motorcycle with the skill of an acrobat. In no time, Linkogle won freestyle motocross contests and earned the admiration of fans worldwide.
During the early years of freestyle motocross, Linkogle with pals Nathan Fletcher and Trigg Gumm thought up Metal Mulisha as the calling card for the new genre of riders. At contests, Linkogle tagged his bike with Metal Mulisha and soon after created shirts for the motley crew of riders. The group became known as the Metal Mulisha troop and competed under the moniker. Aided by the first-ever freestyle motocross course built at Linkogle’s childhood home, the troop perfected their skills. The new course would become known as the Metal Mulisha compound and serve as the epicenter of the freestyle motocross movement.

World-record jump
On May 5, 2005, at Queensland Raceway, Ipswich, Australia, Linkogle set the world's long-distance record for the 250cc Motorbike class by jumping 255.4 feet.  The world-record jump occurred at an event promoted by the Crusty Demons production company.  During the event, five other riders set world records.

Notable achievements
1993 - Won AMA Amateur National Supercross Series
 
1996 - Created Metal Mulisha company
 
1996 - Created Metal Mulisha Compound

1996 - Won the first freestyle motocross event in Castaic Lake, California, which was promoted by Shane Trittler. 
 
1998 - Performed nationwide on the Vans Warped Tour
 
1998 - Won second place in the Jump Contest in Portland, Oregon
 
1998 - Won third place at Free Air Festival
 
1998 - Promoted first-ever Freestyle Extreme Moto-X Show with the Metal Mulisha Troops at the Winchester Arena, Winchester, California
 
1998 - Won fifth place in the Freeride Motocross Championship
  
1999 - Won second place in the Zero Gravity Festival
 
1999 - Won sixth place in the ESPN X Games in San Francisco, California
 
2001 - Featured rider in Crusty Demons film Crusty 6
 
2001 - Won first place in MX 2002 Moto Survival Tour

2002 - Voted the most popular extreme natural terrain rider in the world by Fox Sports/Bluetorch TV during the 2002 Moto Survival Tour
 
2003 - Nominated for World Stunt Awards and Tories Award for stunts performed in XXX.
 
2005 - Featured rider in 10th Anniversary Crusty Demons World Tour Australia
 
2005 - Performed fire jump stunt off Docklands Wharf in Australia
 
2005 - Performed "superman" stunt into Waitemata Harbour at Princess Wharf in New Zealand

2005 - World-record jump (see above)
 
2006 - Competed with Mike Metzger in the first-ever Freestyle Biker Build-Off by Discovery Channel

Entertainment
1991 - Stunt double for Edward Furlong as John Connor in Terminator 2: Judgment Day.

1998 - Featured in MTV Sports and Music Festival 2 as himself 

2002 - Biker double for Vin Diesel in the film XXX

2002 - Crusty Demons of Dirt, Vol. 4: God Bless the Freaks as himself.

2006 - Biker Build-Off TV series documentary - "Mike Metzger vs. Larry Linkogle" (Episode #5.3)

2009 - Mind of the Demon: The Larry Linkogle Story, based on Linkogle's memoir,  directed and produced by Adam Barker is a dark, analytical look into the psyche of one of the most brilliantly talented, yet aggressively self-destructive minds of our generation.  The film is the winner of the 2009 Bel Air Film Festival for Best Jury International Documentary. and the 2010 Slamdance Film Festival as the Audience Award for Best Documentary Feature.

2013 - Linkogle along with other members of Metal Mulisha starred in the music video "Smash It" by Suicidal Tendencies

References

External links
 Mind of the Demon: the Larry Linkogle Story
 https://web.archive.org/web/20140103200412/http://larrylinkogle.com/
 http://www.metalmulisha.com
 https://twitter.com/MMLinkogle

Living people
1977 births
Freestyle motocross riders